Emara Matha (Location: Lat. 20° 14’ 66" N, Long. 85° 50’ 15" E., Elev. 58 ft.) is located in the north-eastern embankment of Bindu Sarobara (tank), north west of the Uttaresvara temple precinct in Bhubaneswar. It is on the left side of the Kedaragouri lane leading from Kedara-Gouri temple to Vaital temple (Tinimundia deul). This Matha was originally a branch of the Emar Matha of Puri that belongs to Ramanuja sect. It is now used as fire wood godown and is dilapidated. Detailed documentation of the Matha could not be possible as the present occupants opposed and resisted any such activities.

References
https://web.archive.org/web/20120329102547/http://www.indiadivine.org/articles/212-archaelogical-remains-within-puri-mathas.html
 Emar Matha
 List of Hindu temples in India#Orissa
Book: Lesser Known Monuments of Bhubaneswar by Dr. Sadasiba Pradhan

Hindu temples in Bhubaneswar